Bhola Bhala is a 1978 Bollywood action film, directed by Satpal and produced by V. Gopi Krishna. The film stars Rajesh Khanna in a double role and was paired opposite Rekha and Moushumi Chatterjee. The film revolves around the innocent insurance agent Ram Kumar Verma, who falls into the trap of the bandit Nathu Singh, who in turn wants Ram to endorse a Life Insurance Policy in the name of Nathu Singh, so that Nathu can fake a death claim and get the amount from LIC company. The film was a commercial hit upon its release. The musical instrument kalimba was played by Homi Mullan for "Jhuk Gayi Aankhen".

Cast

Rajesh Khanna as Ram Kumar Verma / Nathu Singh "Nathiya" (Double Role) 
Rekha as Champa 
Moushumi Chatterjee as Renu 
Deven Verma as Babu
Jagdeep as Tamanchewala
Naaz as Sarla
Mumtaz Begum as Ram's Mother 
Sulochana Latkar as Renu's Mother
Satyendra Kapoor as Mr. Kapoor
Ramesh Deo as Thakur Ajit Singh
Joginder as Sambha 
Pinchoo Kapoor as General Manager of Jeevan Beema Company

Soundtrack
Lyrics: Anand Bakshi

External links

References

1978 films
1970s action drama films
Indian action drama films
1970s Hindi-language films
Films scored by R. D. Burman
1978 drama films